Ch'uxña Quta (Aymara ch'uxña green, quta lake, "green lake", Hispanicized spelling Chojñakhota, Chojna Khota, Chojna Kkota, Chojña Kkota) is a mountain in the Bolivian Andes, about 4,920 metres (16,142 ft) high. It lies in the Kimsa Cruz mountain range, west of Wallatani Lake. It is situated in the La Paz Department, Loayza Province, Malla Municipality.

See also
 Mama Uqllu
 Quri Ch'uma
 Yaypuri
 List of mountains in the Andes

References 

Mountains of La Paz Department (Bolivia)